Events in the year 1843 in Portugal.

Incumbents
Monarch: Mary II
Prime Minister: António Bernardo da Costa Cabral, 1st Marquis of Tomar

Events

Arts and entertainment

Sports

Births
 
 

24 February – Teófilo Braga, playwright and politician (died 1924)

11 June – Francisco Joaquim Ferreira do Amaral, naval commander and politician (d. 1923).

21 July – Maria Ana de Bragança e Saxe-Coburgo-Gotha, Infanta de Portugal, princess (d. 1884).

Deaths

References

 
1840s in Portugal
Years of the 19th century in Portugal
Portugal